This is the order of battle of Allied and Japanese forces during the Landing at Saidor in 1944.

Allied forces
The Allied Task Force MICHAELMAS consisted of:
 126th Infantry Regimental Combat Team (under Brigadier general Clarence A. Martin; Colonel Joseph S. Bradley as Chief of Staff)
 126th Infantry Regiment
 120th Field Artillery Battalion
 Company A, 114th Engineer Battalion
 Company C and 1st Platoon of Company B, 632nd Tank Destroyer Battalion
 Company A and a platoon of Company D, 107th Medical Battalion
 Detachment of 32nd Quartermaster Company
 Detachment of 732nd Ordnance Company
 Detachment of Military Police Platoon, 32nd Infantry Division
 Headquarters and Headquarters Battery, 191st Field Artillery Group
 Batteries B and D, 209th Coast Artillery Battalion (Automatic Weapons)
 Headquarters and Headquarters Battery, and Batteries A and D, 743rd Coast Artillery Battalion (Gun) (Anti Aircraft)
 Detachment, 8th Engineer Survey Squadron
 Shore Battalion, 542nd Engineer Boat and Shore Regiment
 Company B, 542nd Engineer Boat and Shore Regiment
 Detachment, 93rd Chemical Composite Company
 5th Portable Surgical Hospital
 23rd Field Hospital
 One section of Company C, 543rd Quartermaster Service Battalion
 One section of 2nd Platoon, 601st Graves Registration Company
 Detachment, 32nd Signal Company
 Company C, 262nd Medical Supply Battalion
 Detachment, Australian New Guinea Administrative Unit (Australian Army)
 2nd Combat Assignment Unit (Photo)
 121st Field Artillery Battalion
 27th Medical Supply Platoon (Aviation)
 Company C (collecting), 135th Medical Regiment
 1st Platoon, 670th Clearing Company
 808th Engineer Aviation Battalion
 Battery A, less one platoon, 236th Anti Aircraft Artillery Searchlight Battalion
 3rd Platoon, 453rd Engineer Depot Company
 21st Ordnance Company, plus attachments
 Detachment of Company A, 60th Signal Battalion
 863rd Engineer Aviation Battalion
 One platoon of 189th Gasoline Supply Company
 5th Malaria Survey Unit,
 15th Malaria Control Unit

The following were attached to the Task Force:
 10th Air Liaison Party (USAAF)
 Naval Beach party (USN)
 Detachment, 15th Weather Squadron (USAAF)
 Detachment, 21st Fighter Sub Sector (USAAF)
 Assault Echelon, Company B, 583rd Signal Aircraft Warning Battalion (USAAF)
 Radar Repair Team, B-12 (USAAF)

The following were later assigned:
 860th Engineer Aviation Battalion (less Companies B and C and HQ and Survey Company)
 1st and 3rd Battalion Combat Teams, 128th Infantry Regimental Combat Team
 18th Portable Surgical Hospital,

Japanese forces

The Japanese forces engaged in the area consisted of:
20th Division
 79th Infantry Regiment
 80th Infantry Regiment
 20th Engineer Regiment
 20th Transport Regiment
 26th Field Artillery Regiment (2nd and 3rd Battalions)
 Field Hospital
51st Division
 61st Infantry Regiment
 85th Convoy Group (Naval)
 5th Shipping Engineer Regiment
 8th Shipping Engineer Regiment
 33rd Engineer Regiment
 Independent Mortar battalion
41st Division
 238th Infantry Regiment

Notes

Operation Cartwheel
World War II orders of battle